Nicoletta Rizzi (1 January 1940 – 17 January 2010) was an Italian  television, stage and film actress.

Life
Rizzi was born in Milan in 1940. She was mainly active on television, where she was best known for the title role in the television series A come Andromeda.

She was co-founder and secretary of SAI (Society of Italian  Actors), later known as Sindacato Attori, a union of actors affiliated to CGIL.

Selected filmography
 Come Play with Me (1968)
 Cuore di mamma (1969)
 A come Andromeda (1971)
 Indian Summer (1972)
 I Nicotera (1972)
 The Last Desperate Hours (1974)
 Gamma (1975)

References

External links  

 

1940 births
2010 deaths
Actresses from Milan
Italian film actresses
20th-century Italian actresses
Italian stage actresses
Italian television actresses